Juan Manuel 'Juanma' Pavón Domínguez (born 15 February 1976) is a Spanish retired footballer who played as a midfielder, and is the current manager of CD San Roque de Lepe.

Club career
Born in Huelva, Andalusia, Pavón finished his formation at Recreativo de Huelva, and made his senior debuts while on loan at Ayamonte CF in 1995. He was promoted to the main squad in Segunda División B in the following year by manager Joaquín Caparrós, appearing regularly.

In the 1998 summer Pavón was loaned to AD Ceuta, also in the third level. He returned to Recre after the expiry of his loan, and despite appearing sparingly for the former, was included in the first team and made his debut as a professional on 7 November 1999, coming on as a late substitute in a 0–2 away loss against Levante UD in the Segunda División.

On 8 November 2001 Pavón scored the first ever goal of Estadio Nuevo Colombino, and also netted the second in a 3–0 win against Newcastle United. Two months later, however, he moved to third level's Algeciras CF, alleging lack of match experience.

Pavón subsequently resumed his career in the third division but also in Tercera División, representing CD Badajoz, CD Alcalá, Racing Club Portuense and Ayamonte. He retired with the latter in 2009, aged 33.

Post-playing career
After his retirement Pavón became Carlos Ríos' assistant at Recreativo de Huelva B. In 2012, he was appointed manager of the club's Juvenil squad.

On 10 February 2015 Pavón was named manager of the main squad, replacing fired José Luis Oltra. On 24 March, despite only suffering one defeat in six games, he was replaced by José Dominguez but remained in the first team, being appointed assistant manager.

Subsequently, Pavón was in charge of the reserves until October 2016, as he was appointed manager of the first team.

On 25 October 2017, Pavón was named CF Pobla de Mafumet manager.

Managerial statistics

References

External links

1970 births
Living people
Footballers from Huelva
Spanish footballers
Association football midfielders
Segunda División players
Segunda División B players
Tercera División players
Recreativo de Huelva players
AD Ceuta footballers
Algeciras CF footballers
CD Badajoz players
CD Alcalá players
Spanish football managers
Segunda División managers
Segunda División B managers
Segunda Federación managers
Tercera División managers
Recreativo de Huelva managers
CF Pobla de Mafumet managers
Cádiz CF B managers